Colstar (foaled 1996 in Kentucky) is an American Thoroughbred racehorse and broodmare. Sired by the 1991 Breeders' Cup Mile winner, Opening Verse, she was out of the mare Ascend, a daughter of Preakness and Belmont Stakes winner, Risen Star.

Racing in Maryland, Colstar's first important win came in 1999, in the Grade III Martha Washington Stakes, following by a win the next year in the Gallorette Handicap. Her other racing successes includes back-to-back wins in the Locust Grove Handicap at Churchill Downs and the Grade I Flower Bowl Invitational Stakes at Belmont Park.

Retired to broodmare duty, Colstar has produced four unraced offspring to date.

References
 Colstar's pedigree and partial racing stats

1996 racehorse births
Thoroughbred family 1-n
Racehorses bred in Kentucky
Racehorses trained in the United States